Ethan Christopher Dobbelaere (born November 14, 2002) is an American professional soccer player who plays as a midfielder for Major League Soccer club Seattle Sounders FC.

Professional career
An academy product, Dobbelaere signed with the Seattle Sounders FC first team on June 15, 2020.

Dobbelaere was loaned to Czech club MFK Vyškov on February 5, 2022.

Career statistics

Club

References

External links
 

2002 births
Living people
Soccer players from Seattle
American people of Belgian descent
American soccer players
Association football midfielders
Major League Soccer players
USL Championship players
Tacoma Defiance players
Seattle Sounders FC players
Homegrown Players (MLS)
United States men's youth international soccer players
MLS Next Pro players